James Tooley (13 October 1899 – 30 January 1983) was a British weightlifter. He competed at the 1924 Summer Olympics and the 1928 Summer Olympics.

References

External links
 

1899 births
1983 deaths
British male weightlifters
Olympic weightlifters of Great Britain
Weightlifters at the 1924 Summer Olympics
Weightlifters at the 1928 Summer Olympics
Sportspeople from Firozpur
20th-century British people